Panahon.TV (Walang Pinipiling Panahon ang Pagbibigay Impormasyon) is a syndicated daily weather news program aired on One PH, the 24-hour Filipino-language news channel of Cignal, which airs from Monday to Friday at 5:00 AM (UTC+8), direct from the PAGASA Weather and Flood Forecasting Center in Quezon City. This is co-produced by the Philippine Atmospheric, Geophysical and Astronomical Services Administration (PAGASA), together with Lina Group of Companies' communication arm, UBE Media, and Air 21. From its inception on September 10, 2012, until December 31, 2016, the program was aired on PTV-4. It also aired on Great Commission Television (GCTV), also one of BEAM's subchannels. But since its removal from BEAM, all programming switched to Pilipinas HD. The show also airs on MBC's 24-hour cable channel DZRH News Television every Weekdays at 12:00 PM (during DZRH Network News) and 5:00 PM (UTC+8). In the 4th quarter of 2017, Life TV started airing the program every weekdays at 6:00 AM.

The program also has Panahon.TV Express every Monday to Friday at 6:00 PM. On several occasions when a weather disturbance entered the Philippine Area of Responsibility, Panahon.TV carries the live press conferences from PAGASA Weather Center and usually extend the Express editions until midnight.

Developments
Panahon.TV also has a mobile application which can be downloaded for free on Android and iOS users. Aside from television and the mobile app, Panahon.TV also supplies weather information and news on DWIZ 882 kHz and DZIQ 990 kHz on AM radio, major newspapers and magazines including Philippine Daily Inquirer, Inquirer Libre, Inquirer Bandera, Inquirer Golf, The Philippine Star, BusinessWorld, The Manila Times, Pilipino Mirror, BusinessMirror, United Daily News, United Daily Press, Cebu Daily News and Philippines Graphic, and outdoor advertising through Inquirer Catalyst Media and online websites.

Hosts
 Angelique Agarap (2022–present)
 Francis Orcio (2022–present)
 Pia Mercado (2022-present)

Former Hosts
 April Enerio
 Aubrey Ner
 Earle Figuarcion
 Jemmah Amor Larrosa 
 Jesy Basco 
 Juliet Caranguian 
 Harry Bayona
 Meg Siozon
 Rachel Pelayo
 Desserie Dionio
 Kathy San Gabriel
 Dale Cabuquin (2019)
 Patrick Obsuna (2018–2021)
 Trisha Garin (2018–2022)
 Mark Jiao (2021–2022)

Former Segments
 Laging Handa
 Tamang Oras
 Sigla
 Ang Mundo ng Pagasa
 Ulat Pang-Mulat

See also
 Weather forecasting

References

External links
Panahon.TV website

Philippine television news shows
People's Television Network original programming
One PH original programming
Manila Broadcasting Company
2012 Philippine television series debuts
Filipino-language television shows